The Footscray Bulldogs Baseball Club is a Baseball Club based in the inner Melbourne suburb of Yarraville. The club was formed in 1925
.

The Club currently fields senior teams in Summer in the Baseball Victoria Summer League in Division 3, Women's teams in Division 1 and 2 and Junior teams. In winter the club fields 3 senior men’s teams in the Melbourne Winter Baseball League C and C reserve section and D grade. 

During the 2012-2013 Summer Season, the Bulldogs were successful in winning the Men's Divisions 3 Reserves and Women's Division 2 Premierships.

References

External links
Footscray Baseball Club
Baseball Victoria Summer League
Melbourne Winter Baseball League
Dandenong Baseball Association

1925 establishments in Australia
Baseball teams established in 1925
Sports clubs established in 1925
Australian baseball clubs
Baseball teams in Melbourne
Sport in the City of Maribyrnong